A Very Serious Person is a 2006 drama film directed by Charles Busch and starring Polly Bergen, Charles Busch, Dana Ivey, Julie Halston, Carl Andress, and P.J. Verhoest.

Plot 
Jan (Charles Busch), an itinerant male nurse from Denmark, takes a new job with Mrs. A (Polly Bergen), a terminally ill Manhattan woman raising her parentless thirteen-year-old grandson, Gil (PJ Verhoest). Spending the summer by the shore, the emotionally reserved Jan finds himself oddly cast as a mentor to Gil in having to prepare the sensitive boy for life with his cousins in Florida after his grandmother's death. A deep friendship grows between these two solitary people. By the end of the summer, Gil has developed a new maturity and independence, while the enigmatic Jan has revealed his own vulnerability.

Cast

References

External links
 Movie's official website
 
 

2006 films
2000s teen drama films
American teen LGBT-related films
American teen drama films
LGBT-related drama films
2006 drama films
2006 LGBT-related films
2000s English-language films
2000s American films